Boigbeat is a locality situated in The Mallee region.  It is situated about 9 kilometres south east of Sea Lake and 11 kilometres north west of Berriwillock.

The place name Boigbeat is derived from the traditional Aboriginal word for the location which was Boigbeal with the word beal meaning "redgum" and referring to the only clump of gum trees for many miles.

Boigbeat Post Office opened on 1 July 1898 and closed in 1970.

Notes and references

Towns in Victoria (Australia)
Mallee (Victoria)